Michael Gabriel Martínez Tiburcio (born September 16, 1982) is a Dominican professional baseball utility player for the High Point Rockers of the Atlantic League of Professional Baseball. He has played in Major League Baseball (MLB) for the Philadelphia Phillies, Pittsburgh Pirates, Cleveland Indians, Boston Red Sox, and Tampa Bay Rays.

Professional career

Washington Nationals
Martínez began in the Washington Nationals organization, commencing his professional career in 2006. That year, he played for the Vermont Lake Monsters, Savannah Sand Gnats and Potomac Nationals, hitting a combined .265 with 11 stolen bases in 82 games. In 2007, he played for the Hagerstown Suns and hit .250 with 13 stolen bases in 116 games. He played for the Potomac Nationals and Harrisburg Senators in 2009, posting a .259 batting average with 10 steals. In 2010, he played for the Senators and Syracuse Chiefs, hitting a combined .272 with 11 home runs and 23 stolen bases.

Philadelphia Phillies
The Philadelphia Phillies selected Martínez from the Nationals after the 2011 season as a Rule 5 draft pick. He made the Phillies' Opening Day roster as a reserve player. He made his major league debut on April 3 against the Houston Astros and recorded his first major league hit and RBI. He hit his first major league career home run on July 17 against the New York Mets. He spent the season acting as a utility infielder and outfielder, recording a .196 batting average with 3 home runs and 24 RBI in 89 games. Due to his remaining on the club's roster for the entire regular season, he remained in the organization thereafter per Rule 5 regulations.

Martínez opened the 2012 year on the Disabled List due to a broken foot suffered during Spring Training. He joined the Lehigh Valley IronPigs, the Phillies' Triple-A affiliate, in early June. After playing only one game with Lehigh Valley, Martínez returned to the Phillies' 25-man roster following an injury to second baseman Freddy Galvis. On June 27, Martínez was optioned to Lehigh Valley to make room for Chase Utley. Martínez was called up again when Mike Fontenot was designated for assignment.

Martínez began 2013 at Triple-A, but his contract was purchased on May 24 because Chase Utley was placed on the 15-day DL. He was designated for assignment on June 22, and outrighted off the roster on October 3. He elected free agency on October 8. In 29 games for the Phillies in 2013, he hit .175 with 3 RBI.

Pittsburgh Pirates
On December 18, 2013, the Pittsburgh Pirates signed Martínez to a minor league deal. His contract was selected from the Triple-A Indianapolis Indians on June 12, and he was optioned back to Indianapolis on August 19. He was designated for assignment on September 2, 2014, when the contract of Chase d'Arnaud was selected and was added to the 40-man roster. Martínez elected free agency in October 2014.

Cleveland Indians
Martínez signed a minor league deal with the Cleveland Indians on February 11, 2015. On April 9, 2015 he was assigned to the Triple-A Columbus Clippers. The Indians purchased his contract from Columbus on September 4, 2015 and added him to the major-league roster. On July 2, 2016, Martínez was designated for assignment to make room on the 25-man roster for Shawn Morimando after a 19-inning game the day before that exhausted the entire bullpen. He hit .283 in 60 at-bats for the Indians. He was the final out of the 2016 World Series against the Chicago Cubs.

Boston Red Sox
On July 8, 2016, Martínez was traded to the Boston Red Sox in exchange for cash. During his time with Boston, Martínez hit .167/.286/.167 with no home runs and no RBI in 6 at bats. Martínez appeared in 4 games and starting in one game, playing in right field.

Second stint with the Indians
After being designated for assignment by the Red Sox on August 2, 2016, Martínez was claimed by the Indians off waivers on August 4. Martínez hit into the final out to Kris Bryant in the Indians' Game 7 loss in the 2016 World Series to the Chicago Cubs, which was their first World Series championship in 108 years. On November 23, 2016, he was outrighted to Triple-A. He signed a new minor league contract with the Indians organization on December 1. 

The Indians purchased Martínez's contract on April 2, 2017, adding him to their 2017 opening day roster. Martínez was designated for assignment on May 14, 2017.

Tampa Bay Rays
On May 18, 2017, the Tampa Bay Rays acquired Martínez in exchange for cash considerations. He was designated for assignment on June 19 to create room for Trevor Plouffe. He became a free agent on June 23, 2017.

Third stint with the Indians
Martínez signed a minor league contract with the Cleveland Indians on June 25, 2017. He elected free agency on November 6, 2017, and signed a minor league contract with the Indians on December 2 with an invitation to spring training in 2018.  He elected free agency on November 3, 2018.

Lancaster Barnstormers
On March 11, 2019, Martínez signed with the Lancaster Barnstormers of the independent Atlantic League of Professional Baseball. He became a free agent after the 2020 season.

High Point Rockers
On March 9, 2021, Martínez signed with the High Point Rockers of the Atlantic League of Professional Baseball. He became a free agent following the season. On February 8, 2022, Martínez re-signed with the Rockers for the 2022 season.

References

External links

1982 births
Living people
Boston Red Sox players
Clearwater Threshers players
Cleveland Indians players
Columbus Clippers players
Dominican Republic expatriate baseball players in the United States
Estrellas Orientales players
Hagerstown Suns players
Harrisburg Senators players
High Point Rockers players
Indianapolis Indians players

Lancaster Barnstormers players
Lehigh Valley IronPigs players
Major League Baseball players from the Dominican Republic
Philadelphia Phillies players
Pittsburgh Pirates players
Potomac Nationals players
Savannah Sand Gnats players
Syracuse Chiefs players
Tampa Bay Rays players
Vermont Lake Monsters players
Yaquis de Obregón players
Dominican Republic expatriate baseball players in Mexico
Sportspeople from Santo Domingo